Master of Disguise is the first album by American speed metal band Savage Grace, released in 1985.

Track listing 
All songs by Christian Logue except Lions Roar and Sons of Iniquity By Brian EastBMI

 "Lions Roar" - 1:02	
 "Bound to Be Free" - 4:26
 "Fear My Way" - 4:22
 "Sins of the Damned" - 4:19
 "Into the Fire" - 3:29
 "Master of Disguise" - 4:03
 "Betrayer" - 4:57
 "Sons of Iniquity" - 4:40
 "No One Left to Blame" - 4:14

Personnel 
 Mike Smith - vocals
 Christian Logue - guitars
 Brian East - bass
 Dan Finch - drums

References 

1985 debut albums